Gillion Pudumo Mashego (born 23 November 1965) is a South African politician who served as the Mpumalanga MEC (Member of the Executive Council) for Public Works, Roads and Transport from July 2018 until February 2021. He has been a Member of the Mpumalanga Provincial Legislature for the African National Congress since May 2014. He was the provincial Health MEC from May 2014 until July 2018.

Early life and education
Gillion Pudumo Mashego was born on the 23 November 1965 in Pilgrim's Rest. He attended and matriculated from Sekwai High School. Mashego studied at the Mapulaneng College of Education.

Political career
Mashego joined the United Democratic Front in 1985 and was active in the Hlabekisa Youth Congress. He was also a member of the Mass Democratic Movement and the South African Students Congress. He proceeded to work as a teacher at his former high school between 1988 and 1989. Within the African National Congress, he has served as a member of Bohlabela region. He was first elected deputy chairperson before being elected chairperson.

In 2000, Mashego was employed as a community liaison officer in the provincial department of the sports, culture and recreation. He was later promoted to assistant director. He then worked as a personal assistant in the office of the MEC for Safety and Security. He later occupied the same position in both the agriculture and public works, roads and transport departments.

Mashego was  nominated to the Mpumalanga Provincial Legislature after the provincial election held on 7 May 2014. He took office as an MPL on 21 May. Premier David Mabuza appointed him MEC for Health. In March 2018,  Refilwe Mtsweni-Tsipane was elected as the provincial premier. She kept  Mashego in his post until July 2018, when she announced that he and the Public Works MEC Sasekani Manzini would exchange positions. The changes came into effect on 4 July.

After the 2019 election, Mashego was reappointed to the provincial legislature for his second term. Mtsweni-Tsipane kept him in his post.

On 24 February 2021, premier Mtsweni-Tsipane reshuffled her executive. She removed Mashego from the executive and announced that Mohita Latchminarain would take over as the Public Works MEC.

Personal life
Mashego tested positive for COVID-19 on 13 July 2020.

References

External links
Gillion Pudumo Mashego – People's Assembly

Living people
1965 births
20th-century South African politicians
21st-century South African politicians
African National Congress politicians
Members of the Mpumalanga Provincial Legislature